T. Wildman & Sons were an English company and specialists in the manufacture of bobbins for the textile industry. They manufactured a variety of shielded ring bobbins (twist and weft), tubes and pirns. The firm was established in 1859.

In 1872, Mr Thomas Wildman purchased Willow Mill, located at Copy Lane, Caton with Littledale, Lancashire, and the manufacturing was moved there.

With the decline of the textile industry, the mill moved to the manufacture of brushes, which was continued until the close of the mill in 1973. A part of the contents of the mill was donated to Lancashire County Council Museum Service.

References

Defunct manufacturing companies of England
Companies based in Lancashire
History of Lancashire
British companies established in 1859
Manufacturing companies established in 1859
Manufacturing companies disestablished in 1973
1859 establishments in England
1973 disestablishments in England